The 2011 Bulgarian Supercup was the ninth Bulgarian Supercup match, a football match which was contested between the "A" professional football group champion, Litex Lovech, and the winner of the Bulgarian Cup, CSKA Sofia. The match was held on 30 July 2011 at the Lazur Stadium in Burgas.

CSKA Sofia secured a record 4th Bulgarian Supercup. The Reds went on to win this match 3–1, with two goals from Spas Delev, and one from Ianis Zicu after Célio Codó had put Litex ahead in the 6th minute.

Match details

References

2011
PFC CSKA Sofia matches
PFC Litex Lovech matches
Supercup